The 1961 Yukon general election was held on 11 September 1961 to elect the seven members of the Yukon Territorial Council. The council was non-partisan and had merely an advisory role to the federally appointed Commissioner.

Members elected

References

1961
1961 elections in Canada
Election
September 1961 events in Canada